Aslan Ahmad Aslanov (Azerbaijani: Aslanov Aslan Əhməd oğlu) is an Azerbaijani journalist. From 2018 to 2022, he was Chairman of the Board of the Azerbaijan State News Agency (AZERTAC). He has been recognized as an Honorary Culture Worker of the Azerbaijan Republic (2000) and has been awarded the Tereggi Medal (2005), Order for the Services to the Motherland (2010), Shohrat Order (2011), 20th Anniversary Medal of TURKSOY (2014), Jubilee Silver Medal of the Commonwealth of Independent States as well as the Hasan bey Zardabi, Golden Pen and Supreme Media awards.

Biography 

Aslan Aslanov was born on August 18, 1951 in Jabrail, the Republic of Azerbaijan. He has been working in the press for more than 40 years.

In 1975, he graduated from the faculty of journalism of the Azerbaijan State University.

In 1975–1992, he contributed to various newspapers, including Kommunist.

In 1992, Aslanov joined AzerTAc as a correspondent and was later promoted to the positions of Deputy Editor-In-Chief and Editor-In-Chief.

In 1997, he was appointed First Deputy Director General of AzerTAc by a Decree of President of the Republic of Azerbaijan Heydar Aliyev.

In October, 2002, he was appointed Director General of AzerTAc a Decree of President of the Republic of Azerbaijan Heydar Aliyev.

From 1993 to 2002, as a special correspondent of AzerTAc, he accompanied President of the Azerbaijan Republic Heydar Aliyev in overwhelming majority of his foreign visits.

Since 1979 he has been a member of the Union of Journalists of Azerbaijan.

From December 12, 2007 he has been a member of the executive board of the Organization of Asia-Pacific News Agencies (OANA).

In September 2013, Aslan Aslanov was elected Vice President of OANA.

From 2004 he has been a member of the Azerbaijan State Commission on Prisoners of War, Hostages and Missing Persons; from 2006 he has been a member of the Coordination Council of World Azerbaijanis; from 2010 he has been a member of the Philosophical Society of the Russian Academy of Sciences.

From 2008 he has presided over the Association of Turkic-Speaking News Agencies.

From July 2011-March 2013 he was president of BSANNA, the Black Sea Association of National News Agencies, which groups news agencies from 14 countries

In 2013, he was elected a member of the International Council of Experts for World Rating

In November 2013 he was elected a member of the News Agencies World Council 

He was elected member of the National Commission of the Republic of Azerbaijan for UNESCO by the decree of the Azerbaijani President.

2016-2019, President of the New Agencies World Congress and the Organization of Asia-Pacific News Agencies (OANA)

From March 2018-December 2022, he was Chairman of the Board of Azerbaijan State News Agency.

Aslanov is married and has one son.

Awards 

 Honorary Culture Worker of the Azerbaijan Republic (2000), 
 Tereggi medal (2005).
 Order for the Services to the Motherland (2010).
 Shohrat Order for active participation in Azerbaijan's socio-political life (2011).
 Order of Friendship of the Russian Federation (2011).
 “Hasan bey Zardabi”, “Golden Pen” and “Supreme Media” journalistic awards.
 Jubilee Silver Medal of the Commonwealth of Independent States for his contribution to developing integration of CIS countries (2013).
 20th Anniversary Medal of TURKSOY (2014)
 “For Service to Motherland” 1st Class Order (2021)

Books 

 “Heydar Aliyev and AzerTAc”. Baku, 2005.
 "From AzerTAc to AzerTAc: Difficult and Glorious Path". Baku, “Şərq-Qərb”, 2008, 184 pages.
 “AzerTAc-90”. Baku, 2011.
 “AzerTAc's place in the world information network: establishment history and development stages”. Baku: “Azərnəşr”, 2012, 224 pages.
 “Information provision of state policy”. Baku, “Şərq-Qərb”, 2013, 620 pages.
 Media and challenges of time. Baku, 2017, 477 pages.

References

 AZERTAC Web Site
 Organization of Asia-Pacific News Agencies (OANA)

1951 births
Azerbaijani journalists
People from Jabrayil
Living people
Recipients of the Shohrat Order
Recipients of the Tereggi Medal